Colin Kenneth Gordon (born 17 January 1963) is an English former footballer born in Stourbridge, Worcestershire, who played as a striker.

He scored 60 goals in 194 appearances in the Football League playing for Swindon Town, Wimbledon, Gillingham, Reading, Bristol City, Fulham, Birmingham City, Hereford United, Walsall, Bristol Rovers and Leicester City. He went on to play non-league football for Kidderminster Harriers, Gloucester City, on loan from Kidderminster, and Stourbridge.

He then went into sports agency; his company represented England national team manager Steve McClaren and players David James and Theo Walcott, among others. He came to particular notice when he made an attack on football finance, alleging significant levels of corruption within the game.

In April 2015 Gordon returned to Kidderminster Harriers as new football development director of the club. When Gary Whild was removed from the position as manager in September 2015 Gordon was made caretaker manager until the appointment of Dave Hockaday on 9 October 2015. In November 2015 he bought the majority share of the Harriers. Following the sacking of Hockaday on 7 January 2016 Gordon was once again installed as caretaker.

References

1963 births
Living people
Sportspeople from Stourbridge
English footballers
Association football forwards
Lye Town F.C. players
Oldbury United F.C. players
Swindon Town F.C. players
Wimbledon F.C. players
Gillingham F.C. players
Reading F.C. players
Bristol City F.C. players
Fulham F.C. players
Birmingham City F.C. players
Hereford United F.C. players
Walsall F.C. players
Bristol Rovers F.C. players
Leicester City F.C. players
Kidderminster Harriers F.C. players
Gloucester City A.F.C. players
Stourbridge F.C. players
English Football League players
National League (English football) players
British sports agents
Kidderminster Harriers F.C. managers
English football managers